Waubeek may refer to:

Waubeek, Iowa, an unincorporated community in Linn County, Iowa
Waubeek, Wisconsin, an incorporated community of 300 persons in Pepin County, Wisconsin
Waubeek Mound, a mountain in Pepin County, Wisconsin
Wawbeek, Alabama, a community in Alabama